Elachista dorinda is a moth of the family Elachistidae. It is found in Turkey.

The length of the forewings is 3.7–4.5 mm. The forewing costa is narrowly dark grey basally and the ground colour is white with ochreous markings. The hindwings are pale grey.

References

dorinda
Moths described in 2007
Endemic fauna of Turkey
Moths of Asia